Vasili Zurabovich Tsereteli ( born 31 January 1978) is a Russian-Georgian artist, executive director of the Moscow Museum of Modern Art, Vice President of the Russian Academy of Arts.

Education 
Born in 1978 in Tbilisi. In 1996 graduated from United Nations International School, New York. Studied at the Parsons The New School for Design and the School of Visual Arts, from which he graduated in 2000 with a Bachelor of Arts degree. In 2012, he received an EMBA in Skolkovo Moscow School of Management.

Career 
In 2002 Vasili Tsereteli has become an Executive Director of the Moscow Museum of Modern Art, founded in 1999. From 2006 to 2010 Vasili was a Commissioner of the Russian Pavilion at the Venice Biennale.
Vasili Tsereteli is Vice President of the Russian Academy of Arts, member of the Moscow Union of Artists, the Union of Artists of Russia, member of the Presidium of International Council of Museums, member of CIMAM, member of the Council for Culture of the Chairman of the State Duma of the Russian Federation. Vasili Tsereteli is a member of the jury of the Kandinsky Prize, a member of the jury of Sergei Kuryokhin prize, a member of the organizing committee of the Moscow International Biennale for Young Art, art-director of the International "Territory" Festival, commissioner of the Ministry of Culture of the Russian Federation at the international exhibitions in Venice. Also Vasili Tsereteli  is a member of the jury of the All-Russian contest of ideas of literary sites "Litsled", and a member of the Board of Trustees of the Foundation "Support for children and families in difficult situations."
Vasili Tsereteli is a member of the Public Chamber of the Central Federal District of the Russian Federation. In 2012 Vasili Tsereteli was awarded the Cross of the Order of the King of Spain “For Civil Services”. In 2013 he joined the Public Council under the Ministry of Culture of the Russian Federation and the board of trustees of the National Centre for Contemporary Art.

Honours and awards 
 In 2013 Vasili was awarded the medal of Cyril and Methodius for contribution to the preservation and development of the Slavic cultural heritage. 
 In 2015 he became a Knight (Chevalier) of The French Order of Arts and Letters (Ordre des Arts et des Lettres).

Family 
 Father - Zurab Tsereteli, a Georgian-Russian painter, sculptor and architect.
 Wife - Kira Sacarello Tsereteli, fashion designer.

References

21st-century Russian sculptors
20th-century Russian sculptors
20th-century Russian male artists
Russian male sculptors
1978 births
Living people
Artists from Tbilisi
Russian people of Georgian descent
United Nations International School alumni
21st-century Russian male artists